Lieutenant-General Thomas Meredyth or Meredith (after 1661–1719), of Chelsea, Middlesex, was an Irish officer of the British Army and a politician who sat in the Parliament of Ireland from 1703 to 1719 and as a Whig in the British House of Commons from 1709 to 1710..

Early life
Meredyth was the second son of Arthur Meredyth of Dollardstown in County Meath and his wife Dorothea Bingley, daughter of John Bingley of Dublin. He was originally intended for a legal career but joined the military instead. He served William III as a cavalry officer in Flanders during the Nine Years' War. In April 1691, he was made  Captain in the 3rd Horse, later 2nd Dragoon Guards. He later became Lieutenant-Colonel, and on 1 June 1701 was appointed Adjutant-General of the Forces with promotion to the brevet rank of Colonel of Horse.

Career
In February 1702, Meredyth was appointed Colonel of the 37th Regiment of Foot in the expansion of the Army prior to the War of the Spanish Succession. The regiment was part of the force led by the Duke of Marlborough and Meredyth was promoted Brigadier-General after Blenheim in August 1704. Now in command of a Brigade, he participated in the campaigns of 1705 and 1706, including the Moselle expedition and the forcing of the French lines at Eliksem and Neer-Hespen.

Meredyth was made Major-General in 1706 and Governor of Tynemouth Castle on 20 February 1708. He stood for parliament for Midhurst at the 1708 British general election and after defeat in the poll was seated on petition as Member of Parliament for Midhurst on 8 March 1709. He supported the naturalization of the Palatines in 1709 and after being very ill  at Brussels came back to England in October 1709. He was promoted to Lieutenant-General in 1709 and the Duke of Marlborough tried to obtain a colonelcy for him. However the Queen had promised the intended regiment to John Hill, the brother of her favourite Abigail Masham. However he became Colonel of Lord Mordaunt's regiment, the  Royal_Scots_Fusiliers or 21st Foot in May 1710. He voted  in favour of the impeachment of Dr Sacheverell in 1710.

When the Tories fell in 1714, Meredyth was reinstated and appointed Governor of Londonderry, member of the Irish Privy Council and Colonel of the 20th Regiment of Foot.

Death and legacy
Meredyth died at Dublin on 19 June 1719, leaving  three children by his marriage. His son Arthur inherited his estate in Oxfordshire. He also made provision in his will, for  two illegitimate daughters living in Hertfordshire and a son at school in Lisburn, country Antrim.

References

1660s births
1719 deaths
People from County Meath
Members of Gray's Inn
Members of the Privy Council of Ireland
Whig (British political party) MPs
Irish MPs 1703–1713
British MPs 1708–1710
Irish MPs 1715–1727
British Army generals
2nd Dragoon Guards (Queen's Bays) officers
Lancashire Fusiliers officers
Royal Scots Fusiliers officers
37th Regiment of Foot officers
Irish soldiers
British military personnel of the Nine Years' War
British military personnel of the War of the Spanish Succession
Members of the Parliament of Ireland (pre-1801) for County Meath constituencies
Members of the Parliament of Ireland (pre-1801) for County Waterford constituencies
Members of the Parliament of Great Britain for English constituencies
Thomas